Colonel Arthur John Hamilton Luard, DSO (3 September 1861 – 22 May 1944) was an English first-class cricketer. Luard was a right-handed batsman and an officer in the British Army.

Early life and military career
Luard was born at Waltair, India, the son of Colonel George Francis Luard and Jane Hamilton, daughter of Lieutenant Colonel Johnstone Hamilton. He joined the Army as a lieutenant in May 1882, took part in the Burmese Expedition and was on 1 May 1889 promoted to captain, 2nd Battalion Norfolk Regiment. Luard held a staff appointment as Superintendent of Gymnasia until January 1900, when he went to South Africa to serve in the Second Boer War from 1900 to 1902. He was promoted to major on 8 September 1900, mentioned in Despatches in 1901, awarded two medals and created a Companion of the Distinguished Service Order (DSO) in 1901.

He was promoted to lieutenant colonel in September 1908, and colonel in April 1912, before resigning in September 1912.

Cricket career
Luard made his first-class debut for Gloucestershire against Kent. From 1892 to 1896, Luard played 42 first-class matches for the county, with his final first-class match in his first spell at the county coming against Middlesex.

Luard toured Scotland with the county in 1893, playing two non first-class matches against Scotland and a Scotland XI. In 1894 Luard toured Ireland with the county, playing a single non first-class match against Dublin University. During Luard's spell with the county he also played two first-class matches for the Marylebone Cricket Club in 1893, against Yorkshire and Kent.

In 1897 Luard made his debut for Hampshire against Lancashire. Luard played five first-class matches for Hampshire in 1897, with his final first-class match coming against Essex.

Ten years after his last first-class appearance, Luard returned to Gloucestershire in 1907 for his second spell with the county, playing three matches in the 1907 County Championship, with his final first-class match for the county coming against Surrey. In his 45 matches for Gloucestershire, Luard scored 1,140 runs at a batting average of 14.43, with four half centuries and a career high score of 75* in 1892 against Surrey.

Luard died at Guildford, Surrey on 22 May 1944.

References

External links
Arthur Luard at Cricinfo
Arthur Luard at CricketArchive
Matches and detailed statistics for Arthur Luard

1861 births
1944 deaths
Cricketers from Visakhapatnam
English cricketers
Gloucestershire cricketers
Marylebone Cricket Club cricketers
Hampshire cricketers